The following is a list of places on the Jurassic Coast in southern England, in East Devon and Dorset, from west to east.

Note that this is a more complete list than the template below.

East Devon

 Orcombe Point near Exmouth
 Sandy Bay
 Straight Point
 Otter Cove
 Littleham Cove
 Budleigh Salterton
 Otterton Ledge
 Danger Point
 Black Head
 Brandy Head
 Crab Ledge
 Chiselbury Bay
 Smallstones Point
 Ladram Bay
 Hern Point Rock
 Big Picket Rock
 Tortoiseshell Rocks
 Chit Rocks
 High Peak
 Peak Hill
 Sidmouth
 Bulverton
 Salcombe Hill Cliff
 Chapman's Rocks
 Salcombe Mouth
 Dunscombe Cliff
 Hook Ebb
 Weston Mouth
 Weston Cliff
 Weston Ebb
 Coxe's Cliff
 Littlecombe Shoot
 Branscombe
 Branscombe Mouth
 Sherborne Rocks
 Beer Head
 Beer Quarry Caves
 Beer
 Seaton
 Seaton Hole
 Seaton Bay
 Haven Cliff
 Culverhole Point
 Humble Point
 Pinhay Bay
 Seven Rock Point

West Dorset

 Poker's Pool
 Lyme Regis
 Dinosaurland Fossil Museum
 Lyme Regis Museum
 Lyme Bay
 Canary Ledges
 Black Ven
 Charmouth
 Charmouth Heritage Coast Centre
 St Gabriel's Mouth
 Golden Cap
 Seatown
 East Ebb
 East Ebb Cove
 Great Ebb
 Thorncombe Beacon
 Eype's Mouth
 West Bay
 East Cliff
 Burton Cliff
 Burton Bradstock
 Burton Beach
 Cogden Beach
 West Bexington
 Abbotsbury
 Abbotsbury Gardens
 Abbotsbury Swannery
 Chesil Beach
 Gore Cove
 Chickerell
 Bennetts Water Gardens

Weymouth and Portland

 Isle of Portland
 Chesil Cove
 Tar Rocks
 Clay Ope
 Hallelujah Bay
 West Cliff
 Blacknor
 Mutton Cove
 Wallsend Cove
 Pulpit Rock
 Portland Bill
 Portland Raised Beach
 Red Crane
 Cave Hole
 Church Ope Cove
 Portland Museum
 Jurassica
 Durdle Pier
 King's Pier
 Folly Pier
 Folly Pier Waterworks
 Salt Pans
 Freshwater Bay
 Balaclava Bay
 East Weare Battery
 East Weare Camp
 East Weare Rifle Range
 Portland Harbour
 Weymouth
 Newton's Cove
 Nothe Gardens
 Weymouth Harbour
 Weymouth Pier including Jurassic Skyline
 Weymouth Beach
 Weymouth Bay
 Greenhill
 Furzy Cliff
 Jordan Hill
 Bowleaze Cove

West Dorset

 Broadrock
 Redcliff Point
 Black Head
 Osmington Mills
 Bran Point
 Perry Ledge
 Ringstead village
 RAF Ringstead
 West Ringstead
 Ringstead Bay
 Burning Cliff

Purbeck District

 White Nothe
 Chaldon Hill
 Bat's Head
 Swyre Head (Lulworth)
 Scratchy Bottom
 Durdle Door
 Man of War Bay
 St Oswald's Bay
 Pinion Rock
 Dungy Head
 Stair Hole
 Lulworth Cove
 Lulworth Ranges
 Bindon Hill
 Fossil Forest
 Mupe Rocks
 Mupe Ledges
 Mupe Bay
 Black Rock
 Arish Mell

Isle of Purbeck

 Flower's Barrow
 Cow Corner
 Worbarrow Bay 
 Worbarrow Tout
 Pondfield Cove
 Gold Down
 Gad Cliff
 Wagon Rock
 Tyneham
 Brandy Bay
 Long Ebb
 Hobarrow Bay
 Broad Bench
 Charnel
 Kimmeridge
 Kimmeridge Oil Field
 Kimmeridge Bay
 Gaulter Gap
 Clavell Tower
 Hen Cliff
 Cuddle
 Kimmeridge Ledges
 The Etches Collection
 Clavell's Hard
 Rope Lake Head
 Swyre Head
 Egmont Bight 
 Egmont Point
 Chapman's Pool
 Emmetts Hill
 St Aldhelm's Head (or St Alban's Head)
 St. Aldhelm's Chapel, St. Aldhelm's Head
 West Man 
 Winspit
 East Man
 Worth Matravers
 Seacombe Quarry
 Seacombe Cliff
 Dancing Ledge
 Blackers Hole
 Anvil Point
 Tilly Whim Caves
 Durlston Head
 Durlston Country Park
 Durlston Castle
 Great Globe
 Durlston Bay
 Peveril Point
 Swanage
 Swanage Bay
 Ballard Down
 Ballard Point
 The Pinnacles
 Parson's Barn
 Old Harry Rocks

See also
 Purbeck Hills
 Isle of Purbeck
 Geology of Dorset
 Geology of the United Kingdom
 List of fossil sites
 List of Dorset beaches
 South West Coast Path
 UK coastline

Lists of places in England
Natural regions of Dorset
Geology of Dorset
Geology of Devon
United Kingdom geology-related lists